Nirbal Indian Shoshit Hamara Aam Dal is a political party in India. It was founded in 2016. The Nishad Party was formed for empowerment of Nishad, Kewats, Bind, Mallah, Sahani, Kashyap, Gond communities whose traditional occupations centred on rivers, such as boatmen or fishermen. Its founder is Sanjay Nishad, a former member of the Bahujan Samaj Party. According to Nishad, a separate party representing these communities was essential as they had played an integral role in the victories of BSP and Samajwadi Party.

The Nishad Party ran 100 candidates in the 2017 Uttar Pradesh Legislative Assembly election in alliance with Peace Party of India, the Apna Dal and the Jan Adhikar Party. In the election swept by the BJP, the NISHAD party won only the Gyanpur constituency. Party leader Sanjay Nishad came third in Gorakhpur Rural polling 35,000 votes.

For the 2018 by-elections to Phulpur and Gorakhpur Lok Sabha seats, Samajwadi Party united with several smaller parties, including Nishad Party, to extend its social base beyond Yadavs and Muslims. Sanjay Nishad's son, Praveen Kumar Nishad was selected as the Samajwadi candidate in Gorakhpur, where the Nishad community is the second-largest demographic group. In a major upset, Praveen Nishad wrested the seat from BJP, which had not lost the seat since 1989. The victory margin was 21,000 votes.

In the recently concluded 2022 UP State Election, Nishad party fought in alliance with BJP and won 6 seats.

References

External links
Official Website

2016 establishments in India
Dalit politics
Member parties of the National Democratic Alliance
Political parties established in 2016
Political parties in India